Negruzzi is a Romanian surname that may refer to:

Constantin Negruzzi
Ella Negruzzi, daughter of Leon C.
Iacob C. Negruzzi, son of Constantin
Leon C. Negruzzi, son of Constantin
Leon M. Negruzzi, grandson of Leon C. 

Romanian-language surnames